Rising Star is a Hungarian singing reality competition television series, and the Hungarian edition of the international reality television franchise Rising Star. It is based on the Israeli singing competition HaKokhav HaBa (meaning The Next Star) produced by Keshet Broadcasting Ltd. The program format lets viewers vote for contestants via mobile apps. The show premiered in 2014 on channel TV2.

Series summary

Season 1 (2014–2015)

Elimination table

References

External links
Official website (in Hungarian)

2014 Hungarian television series debuts
2015 Hungarian television series endings
Hungarian television shows
Rising Star (franchise)
Talent shows
2010s Hungarian television series
Hungarian-language television shows
TV2 (Hungarian TV channel) original programming